Dock pudding is a distinctive West Yorkshire dish produced chiefly in the Calder Valley area. Its main ingredients are the leaves of bistort (sometimes called "gentle dock" or "Passion dock", though it is not a member of the genus Rumex), together with oatmeal, nettles, onion, and seasoning to taste. Other ingredients are added but each personal family recipe does differ. Traditionally the "pudding" is fried in a frying pan along with bacon. Starting in 1971, an annual World Dock Pudding Championship is held at the local community centre in the village of Mytholmroyd.

The dish is most strongly associated with Calderdale in modern times, but is not unique to that region in history. Like tansy cakes, dock pudding has long been associated with Eastertide, and is still prepared as a Lenten dish in northern England.

See also

Laver bread
English cuisine

References

External links
Mytholmroyd.net
News- Dock pudding recipe
Love food.com - Dock pudding
Foods of England project - Dock Pudding

Puddings
Yorkshire cuisine
Lenten foods
Easter food
Bacon dishes
Oat-based dishes
Fried foods